Robert Berić (born 17 June 1991) is a Slovenian professional footballer who plays as a striker for Chinese Super League club Tianjin Jinmen Tiger. In the 2014–15 season, he ranked 11th in the European Golden Shoe award.

Club career
Berić began his career at the age of five in Krško youth teams before being promoted to their main squad in the 2007–08 season. In 2008, he signed for Interblock. He made his debut at Interblock as a substitute in a 2–1 away victory over Drava Ptuj. He scored his first goal for the club in a 3–0 win over Primorje on 7 December 2008. In total, he played 34 games for Interblock in the Slovenian first division, scoring 12 goals.

In August 2010, Berić joined Maribor together with his teammate Josip Iličić, signing a four-year contract.

In June 2013, he moved to Sturm Graz for a reported fee of €1 million. In the 2013–14 season, he amassed 10 goals and 11 assists.

In 2014, he left Sturm Graz for league rivals Rapid Wien. The transfer fee was estimated at between €700,000 and 800,000. In his first season, he became the league second goalscorer netting 27 goals in 33 appearances which earned him 11th place in the European Golden Shoe award.

Saint-Étienne

On 31 August 2015, Berić joined Saint-Étienne on a four-year deal while the transfer fee paid to Rapid Wien was reported as €6 or 7.5 million. He quickly established himself in the starting lineup and began scoring goals for the club in both the Ligue 1 and the UEFA Europa League campaigns. However, on 8 November 2015 during an away Ligue 1 match against Lyon, Berić suffered a knee injury which sidelined him for the rest of the season. During his time at Saint-Étienne, Berić received the nickname "Terminator".

On 30 August 2017, Berić joined Anderlecht on a one-year loan.

Saint-Étienne recalled Berić from his loan spell at Anderlecht on 1 January 2018.

On 22 April 2018, Berić came off the bench at the start of the second half and scored twice as Saint-Étienne came from behind to beat Troyes 2–1 in a home Ligue 1 match.

On 18 May 2019, Berić scored twice as Saint-Étienne defeated Nice 3–0 in a home Ligue 1 match to secure a top-four finish and qualification for the 2019–20 UEFA Europa League.

Chicago Fire
On 18 January 2020, Major League Soccer club Chicago Fire announced that it had acquired Berić via a transfer deal from Saint-Étienne, and that he had signed for the club as a Designated Player. Berić netted in his debut against the Seattle Sounders, but failed to win the game, losing 2–1.

Following the 2021 season, Berić had his contract option declined by Chicago and left the club.

Career statistics

Club

International
Scores and results list Slovenia's goal tally first, score column indicates score after each Berić goal.

References

External links
Robert Berić at NZS 

1991 births
Living people
People from Krško
Slovenian footballers
Association football forwards
Slovenian expatriate footballers
Slovenian expatriate sportspeople in Austria
Expatriate footballers in Austria
Slovenian expatriate sportspeople in France
Expatriate footballers in France
Slovenian expatriate sportspeople in Belgium
Expatriate footballers in Belgium
Slovenian expatriate sportspeople in the United States
Expatriate soccer players in the United States
Slovenian expatriate sportspeople in China
Expatriate footballers in China
Slovenian Second League players
Slovenian PrvaLiga players
Austrian Football Bundesliga players
Ligue 1 players
Championnat National 3 players
Belgian Pro League players
Major League Soccer players
Chinese Super League players
NK Krško players
NK IB 1975 Ljubljana players
NK Maribor players
SK Sturm Graz players
SK Rapid Wien players
AS Saint-Étienne players
R.S.C. Anderlecht players
Chicago Fire FC players
Tianjin Jinmen Tiger F.C. players
Slovenia youth international footballers
Slovenia under-21 international footballers
Slovenia international footballers
Designated Players (MLS)